This is a list of gliders/sailplanes of the world, (this reference lists all gliders with references, where available) 
Note: Any aircraft can glide for a short time, but gliders are designed to glide for longer.

I

IA
Ae, for "Dirección General de Aerotécnica", on the first period (1927–1936);
F.M.A., for "Fábrica Militar de Aviones", on the second period (1938–1943);
I.Ae., for "Instituto Aerotécnico", on the third period (1943–1952);
IA, meaning not specified, on the fourth (current) period (1952 to 2007).
 IA.54 Cóndor Andino
 IA.54 Carancho
 IA AX-2

I.Ae.
 Ae, for "Dirección General de Aerotécnica", on the first period (1927–1936);
 F.M.A., for "Fábrica Militar de Aviones", on the second period (1938–1943);
 I.Ae., for "Instituto Aerotécnico", on the third period (1943–1952);
 IA, meaning not specified, on the fourth (current) period (1952 to 2007).
 I.Ae 25 Mañque
 I.Ae 33
 I.Ae 34 Clen Antú
 I.Ae 34M
 I.Ae 37G research scale glider
 I.Ae 37P research scale glider/ powered glider
 I.Ae 41 Urubu
 I.Ae 41B
 I.Ae 49
 I.Ae 54 Carancho
 I.Ae 56 Standard
 I.Ae 58 Pucarà research scale glider
 Horten XVI Colibri
 Piernifero

IAR
(Industria Aeronautică Română)
see:ICA-Brasov

ICA-Brasov
(Intreprinderea de Construcţii Aeronautice) c.f. URMV-3, ILL
 ICA IS-28 
 ICA IS-28M
 ICA IS-29
 ICA IS-30
 ICA IS-31
 ICA IS-32
 ICA IS-33
 IAR-35

I.C.A.R.
(Întreprinderea de construcţii aeronautice romȃneşti")
 ICAR 1

IFIL
(Intreprinderea Forestierǎ di Industrializare a Lemnului)
 IFIL RM-1 – (Vladimiir Nowiţchi)
 IFIL RG-1
 IFIL RG-2 – (Vladimiir Nowiţchi)
 IFIL RG-3 – (Vladimiir Nowiţchi)
 IFIL-Reghin RG-4 Pionier 
 IFIL RG-5 Pescăruş 
 IFIL RG-9 Albatros

Iggulden
(William Palmer Iggulden & Jack Iggulden)
 Iggulden Bluebird
 Iggulden Tandem 1929
 Iggulden Termagent 3

IIL 
(Întreprinderea de industrie Locală- Ghimbav) c.f. URMV-3, ICA-Brasov
 IIL IS-4
 IIL IS-5
 IIL IS-7
 IIL IS-8
 IIL IS-9 
 IIL IS-10 
 IIL IS-11
 IIL IS-12
 IIL IS-13
 IIL IS-18 – Iosif Şilimon
 IIL IS-18/25 – Iosif Şilimon

Ikarus
(Ikarus Prva srpska industrija aeroplana, automobila i strojeva)
 Ikarus Meteor
 Ikarus Košava
 Ikarus B.C.6 Kobac
 Ikarus Košava – built by Ikarus Avijaticarski
 Ikarus Košava II – built by Ikarus Avijaticarski
 Ikarus Kosava 57
 Ikarus Kosava 60
 Ikarus Mačka
 Ikarus Meteor 57
 Ikarus Meteor 60
 Ikarus Munja
 Ikarus Orao I
 Ikarus Orao II "Kico"/ IIb/ IIc
 Ikarus P-453 M-W
 Ikarus 920 Desant
 Ikarus 920M

IKV
(Ilmailukerho Vasama)
 IKV-3 Kotka

Ilić
(Milos Ilić / Savezni Vazduhoplovni Centar, Vršac)
 Ilić KBI-14 Mačka
 Ilić Ilindenka

Ilyushin
(Sergei Vladimirovich Ilyushin / OKB Ilyushin)
 Ilyushin Il-32
 Ilyushin Mastyazhart

IMPA 
(IMPA - Industrias Metalúrgicas y Plasticas Argentinas S.A. ),
 IMPA P-38

INAV 
(Instituto Argentino de Vuelo a Vela)
 INAV 1

Inteco 
Velkomaravska, Czech Republic
Inteco L-213A

Isle of Wight gliding club
 IOW Club glider

IPD
(Instituto de Pesquisas e Desenvolvimento)
 IPD Urupema
 IPD Urubu – (PAR PE-80367)

IPE
(Industria Paranaense de Estruturas)
 IPE Quero Quero
 IPE Nhapecan-1
 IPE Nhapecan-2
 IPE 02 Nhapecan
 IPE 03
 IPE 04
 IPE 05 Quero Quero II
 IPE 08

IPT 
(Instituto de Pesquisas Technologicas de Sao Paulo)
 IPT-01 Gafanhoto
 IPT-02 Aratinga
 IPT-03 Saracura
 IPT-05 Jaraguá
 IPT-06 Stratus
 IPT-12 Caboré
 IPT-14
 IPT-15
 IPT-17

IS
(Instytut Szybownictwa – gliding institute) – post World War II
 IS-A Salamandra – Salamander
 IS-B Komar – Gnat
 IS-C Zuraw – Crane
 IS-1 Sęp
 IS-2 Mucha – Fly
 IS-3 ABC
 IS-4 Jastrząb – Hawk
 IS-5 Kaczka – Duck

IS
(Iosif Şilimon - Romanian constructor / designer)
See:- IIL and URMV-3

Isaac
(A. C. T. Isaac)
 Isaac 1910 glider (2 x hang glider)
 Isaac 1923 glider (2-seat Primary)
 Isaac 1929 glider (primary)
 Isaac 1932 glider (A BAC VII, built from a kit)
 Isaac biplane glider

ISF
(Ingenieur-Büro Strauber-Frommholf)
 Strauber-Frommholf Mistral
 ISF Mistral-C

Issoire
 Issoire D77 Iris
 Issoire E78 Silene
 Issoire PIK-20
 Issoire PIK-30

IST
(Philippines Institute of Science and Technology / Antonio J. de leon)
 IST L-10 Balang

ITA
(Instituto Tecnológico de Aeronáutica de São José dos Campos)																																																																																																																																																																																																																																																																																																																																																																																																																																																																																																																																																																																																																																																																																																																																																																																																																																																																																																																																																																																																																																																									
 ITA Urupema

Itoh
(Itoh Hikoki Aviation / Yamasaki Yoshio)
 Itoh D-1
 Itoh C-6

ITS
(Instytut Techniki Szybownictwa – gliding technical institute)- pre World War II
 ITS Jaskółka – Swallow. Low-wing aircraft. Drive: in-line engine. Seating arrangement: tandem. A mock-up for wind tunnel tests was created. Very good aerodynamic properties.
 ITS Wróbel – Sparrow
 ITS-II
 ITS-IVB
 ITS-7 Drozd – Thrush
 ITS-8 –  ing. Wiesław Stępniewski ( preliminary project ), ing. Boleslaw Wiśnicki ( idea: double bar system ). Then a project team was created at ITS, which included: ing. F. Kotowski, ing. Bolesław Wiśnicki, ing. Józef Niespał, ing. Marian Piątek, ing. Rudolf Wojciech Matz.

Ittner
(E. Ittner / Nordbayr. Luftfahrtverband, Nürnberg)
 Nürnberg D-14 Doppeldecker

Notes

Further reading

External links

Lists of glider aircraft